HMS Hero was an H-class destroyer built for the Royal Navy in the mid-1930s. During the Spanish Civil War of 1936–1939 the ship enforced the arms blockade imposed by Britain and France on both sides as part of the Mediterranean Fleet. During the first few months of World War II, Hero searched for German commerce raiders in the Atlantic Ocean and participated in the Second Battle of Narvik during the Norwegian Campaign of April–June 1940 before she was transferred to the Mediterranean Fleet in May where she escorted a number of convoys to Malta. The ship took part in the Battle of Cape Spada in July 1940, Operation Abstention in February 1941, and the evacuations of Greece and Crete in April–May 1941.
 
The ship covered an amphibious landing during the Syria–Lebanon Campaign of June 1941 and began escorting supply convoys in June to Tobruk, Libya shortly afterwards. She was damaged by German dive bombers while rescuing survivors from the minelayer  in October 1941 and resumed escorting convoys to Malta. Hero participated in the Second Battle of Sirte in March 1942 and in Operation Vigorous in June. She sank two German submarines whilst stationed in the Mediterranean in 1942, and was transferred back home late in the year to begin converting to an escort destroyer. The ship was transferred to the Royal Canadian Navy (RCN) in 1943 and renamed HMCS Chaudière. She became part of the Mid-Ocean Escort Force in early 1944 until her transfer back to British coastal waters in May to protect the build-up for Operation Overlord. Together with other ships, she sank three more German submarines during the year. Chaudière was refitting when the war ended in May 1945 and was in poor shape. The ship was paid off in August and later sold for scrap. The process of breaking her up, however, was not completed until 1950.

Description and construction
Steam for the turbines was provided by three Admiralty 3-drum water-tube boilers. The ship's complement was 137 officers and men in peacetime, but this increased to 146 in wartime. In Canadian service, the crew numbered 10 officers and 171 men.

The ship mounted four 4.7-inch Mk IX guns in single mounts, designated 'A', 'B', 'X', and 'Y' from front to rear. For anti-aircraft (AA) defence, Hero had two quadruple Mark I mounts for the 0.5 inch Vickers Mk III machine gun. She was fitted with two above-water quadruple torpedo tube mounts for 21-inch torpedoes. One depth charge rail and two throwers were fitted; 20 depth charges were originally carried, but this increased to 35 shortly after the war began. By mid-1940, this had increased to 44 depth charges.

Ordered on 13 December 1934 from Parsons Marine Steam Turbine Company, Hero was subcontracted to Vickers-Armstrongs and laid down by their High Walker Yard at Newcastle-on-Tyne, England, on 28 February 1935. She was launched on 10 March 1936 and completed on 21 October 1936. Excluding government-furnished equipment like the armament, the ship cost £249,858.

Wartime modifications
Most ships of Heros class had the rear torpedo tubes replaced by a 12-pounder AA gun after the evacuation of Dunkirk in 1940, but it is not clear if she underwent this refurbishment as she was deployed in the Mediterranean until 1943. Other changes made before her conversion to an escort destroyer in 1943 probably included exchanging her two quadruple .50-calibre Vickers machine guns mounted between her funnels for two Oerlikon 20 mm AA guns, the addition of two Oerlikon guns to her searchlight platform and another pair on the wings of the ship's bridge. The ship's director-control tower and rangefinder above the bridge were most likely removed in exchange for a Type 271 target indication radar during the conversion, as was the replacement of 'B' gun by a Hedgehog anti-submarine spigot mortar, and the addition of a Type 286 short-range surface search radar. Two QF 6-pounder Hotchkiss guns were fitted on the wings of her bridge to deal with U-boats at short ranges. The ship also received a HF/DF radio direction finder mounted on a pole mainmast. 'Y' gun was also removed to allow her depth charge stowage to be increased. Late in the war, her Type 286 was replaced by a Type 291 radar.

Career
Hero was assigned to the 2nd Destroyer Flotilla of the Mediterranean Fleet upon commissioning. She patrolled Spanish waters during the Spanish Civil War enforcing the policies of the Non-Intervention Committee. Hero received a refit in June–July 1939 in the UK and rejoined the Mediterranean Fleet upon its completion. The ship remained in the Mediterranean until 5 October when she was transferred to Freetown, Sierra Leone to search for German commerce raiders. Hero returned to the UK in January 1940 and received a refit at Portsmouth from 15 February to 16 March. In the meantime, the 2nd Destroyer Flotilla had been assigned to Home Fleet and the ship rejoined them when her refit was finished.

On 5 April Hero escorted the battlecruiser  as she covered the minelayers preparing to implement Operation Wilfred, an operation to lay mines in the Vestfjord to prevent the transport of Swedish iron ore from Narvik to Germany. The ship and her sister  pretended to lay a minefield off Bud, Norway on 8 April and reported its location to the Norwegians. Hero and the destroyer  streamed their TSDS minesweeping gear in advance of the battleship  and her escort as they steamed up the Vestfjord to engage the remaining German destroyers at Narvik on 13 April. The ship and four other British destroyers pursued the remaining German ships into the Rombaksfjorden (the easternmost branch of the Ofotfjord), east of Narvik, where the lack of ammunition had forced the German ships to retreat. Most of the German destroyers had scuttled and beached themselves at the head of the fjord, but the scuttling charges on  had failed to detonate properly and she was boarded by a small party from Hero. They found nothing of any significance as she'd been abandoned by her crew and the destroyer put a torpedo into her to prevent any salvage.

Hero was transferred to the Mediterranean Fleet on 17 May as part of the reconstituted 2nd Destroyer Flotilla. During the Battle of Cape Spada on 19 July, the ship escorted Australian light cruiser  and rescued some of the 525 survivors from the  together with the other escorting destroyers. The explosion killed five men and wounded three others. Mohawk took off the survivors while Hero fired two torpedoes to scuttle her. The ship participated in Operation Hats in September, before refitting in Malta during November.

On 1 January 1941, Hero was one of the ships that intercepted a Vichy French convoy off Mellila and seized all four merchant ships of the convoy. The ship participated in Operation Excess in early January 1941 and was transferred back to the Mediterranean Fleet. On 27 February, she evacuated a few surviving commandos from the island of Kastelorizo who had attacked the island in Operation Abstention. In mid-April she escorted the fast transport  and three battleships from Alexandria to Malta before going on to escort the battleships as they bombarded Tripoli on 20 April. After refueling in Alexandria on 23 April, Hero sailed for Greece to begin evacuating British and Australian troops from the beaches. During the evacuation of Crete, Hero and the destroyer  evacuated the King of Greece and his entourage on the night of 22/23 May.

Hero escorted the LSI(L)  as she conducted an amphibious landing in early June 1941 on the Lebanese coast during the opening stages of the Operation Exporter. She spent most of the rest of the year escorting convoys to Tobruk. Together with her sister  and the destroyer , the ship escorted  on 25 October whilst en route to Tobruk. They were attacked by Junkers Ju 87 Stuka dive bombers of I./StG 1 that hit Latona and set her afire. Hero and Encounter came alongside and rescued the crew and passengers before Latonas magazine exploded, but Hero was damaged by three near misses whilst alongside. The ship returned to Alexandria for repairs and escorted a convoy to Malta in January 1942. She participated in the 2nd Battle of Sirte on 22 March whilst escorting a convoy to Malta.

During Operation Vigorous in June, Hero formed part of the escort for the covering force of the Mediterranean Fleet for the Malta-bound convoy. At time the ship still had not been fitted for radar. After Panzer Army Africa occupied Mersa Matruh in late June, the Admiralty ordered the submarine tenders  and the Greek  transferred to Haifa, but Medway was torpedoed and sunk en route despite the strong escort. Hero and the destroyer  rescued 1105 survivors between them. On 17 August, the ship rescued some 1,100 survivors of the torpedoed troopship . The ship was ordered back to the United Kingdom, via the Cape of Good Hope, to be converted to an escort destroyer late in the year.

Transfer to the Royal Canadian Navy
Her conversion at Portsmouth lasted from April to November 1943 and Hero was transferred to the Royal Canadian Navy as a gift on 15 November 1943 and renamed HMCS Chaudière. After working up, the ship was assigned to the Escort Group C2 in February 1944, based in Derry. On 6 March 1944, whilst defending Convoy HX 228 west of Ireland, the escorts forced  to the surface where she surrendered after a 32-hour hunt. The submarine could not be towed to port and was torpedoed by the British destroyer . The ship was reassigned to the 11th Escort Group in May 1944 in preparation for Operation Overlord. Two days later, the same ships sank  in the Bay of Biscay west of Brest. In November, Chaudière was sent to Sydney, Nova Scotia for a refit.

The refit did not begin until late January 1945 and was still in progress when the war ended in May. She was found to be in the worst shape of any Canadian destroyer when inspected and was declared surplus to requirements on 13 June. She was paid off on 17 August 1945 and later sold for scrap to the Dominion Steel Company. Her demolition, however, was not completed until 1950.

Poetry
The ship's completion on Tyneside in 1936 inspired the poet Michael Roberts to write a poem entitled "H.M.S. Hero". The poem of twelve lines in three stanzas, begins; "Pale grey, her guns hooded, decks clear of all impediment, / Easily, between the swart tugs, she glides in the pale October sunshine...".

Footnotes

References

External links

 

G and H-class destroyers of the Royal Navy
Ships of the Royal Canadian Navy
Ships built on the River Tyne
1936 ships
World War II destroyers of the United Kingdom
Canadian River-class destroyers
Canadian River-class destroyers converted from G and H-class destroyers
Ships built by Vickers Armstrong